Carbon Dreams is a Lab lit novel by Susan M. Gaines.  It was published by Creative Arts Book Company in 2000 and is Gaines' first novel.

Synopsis 
Set in the 1980s, the story revolves around geochemist Tina Arenas, who is caught up in her work and does not pay much attention to the outside world. When her life takes a turn she was not expecting, she seeks to come to terms with her responsibilities in her personal life and her work.

Reception

Writing for the San Francisco Chronicle, Thomas Christensen said "In her debut novel, "Carbon Dreams," Susan M. Gaines gives us a work that's equal parts geology and romance. Gaines, who has degrees in chemistry and oceanography, has boldly built the novel around challenging scientific theories".

Karen Bushaw-Newton (BioScience) wrote "Susan Gaines combined fact and fiction to depict the life and struggles of a female geochemist as her career developed. The book portrayed the scientific world in both positive and negative ways by highlighting the passion that scientists have for their research, the difficulties and frustrations of finding funding, and the politics of scientific discovery".

In New Scientist the book has been described as "It's all here: the fight for grants, intellectual ownership, a triumph at a conference (dream scene for any researcher), an affair or two and inevitable heartbreak as work edges out the lover. Gripping stuff."

References 

2000 novels
Environmental fiction books
2000 debut novels